Beebeetown is an unincorporated town in Harrison County, Iowa, USA.

History 
Beebeetown was founded in 1880. Beebeetown Highschool was closed in the 1978 and consolidated with Persia, Iowa and Neola, Iowa's school districts to form Tri-Center School District.

Beebeetown is home to the Twisted Tail Restaurant, a diner who won the 2020 Iowa Cattlemen Competition burger competition.

References 

Unincorporated communities in Iowa